Jan Flasieński (1789–1852) was a captain of artillery in the army of the Kingdom of Poland. He studied at the Jagiellonian University in Krakow, worked as a clerk in Warsaw,  and was the author of the first Polish-language travellers' guidebook to Europe.

References
Henryka Foleczyńska, Jan Flasieński, in: Polski Słownik Biograficzny, Tome VII, 1948-1958

1789 births
1852 deaths
Polish male writers